Lost at the Front is a 1927 American comedy film directed by Del Lord and written by Hampton Del Ruth, Frank Griffin and Ralph Spence. The film stars George Sidney, Charles Murray, Natalie Kingston, John Kolb, Max Asher and Brooks Benedict. The film was released on May 29, 1927, by First National Pictures. There are no known archival holdings of the film, so it is presumably a lost film.

Cast      
George Sidney as August Krause
Charles Murray as Patrick Muldoon 
Natalie Kingston as Olga Pietroff
John Kolb as Von Herfiz
Max Asher as Adolph Meyerburg
Brooks Benedict as The Inventor
Ed Brady as Captain Kashluff
Harry Lipman as Captain Levinsky
Nita Martan as Russian girl
Nina Romano as Russian girl

References

External links
 

1927 films
1920s English-language films
Silent American comedy films
1927 comedy films
First National Pictures films
Films directed by Del Lord
American silent feature films
American black-and-white films
1920s American films